The 2000–2001 Tetley's Bitter Cup was the 30th edition of England's rugby union club competition. Newcastle Falcons won the competition defeating Harlequins in the final. The event was sponsored by Tetley's Brewery and the final was held at Twickenham Stadium.

Draw and results

First round (Sep 23)

Second round (Oct 7)

Third round (Oct 21)

Fourth round (Nov 4 & 5)

Fifth round (Nov 11 & 12)

Quarter-finals (Dec 9 & 10)

Semi-finals (Jan 6)

Final

References

2000–01 rugby union tournaments for clubs
2000–01 in English rugby union
2000-01